Ivan Quaresma da Silva (born 7 February 1997), commonly known as Ivan, is a Brazilian professional footballer who plays as a goalkeeper for Vasco da Gama, on loan from Corinthians.

Club career
Born in Rio das Pedras, São Paulo, Ivan joined Ponte Preta's youth setup in 2013, from fierce rivals Guarani. He made his first team – and Série A – debut on 11 December 2016, coming on as a late substitute for Aranha in a 2–0 home defeat of Coritiba.

Promoted to the main squad ahead of the 2017 season, Ivan was mainly a third-choice behind Aranha and João Carlos, as his side suffered relegation. For the 2018 campaign, he became an undisputed starter, and renewed his contract until 2023 on 4 April 2018.

On 29 June 2022, Russian champions FC Zenit Saint Petersburg announced an agreement with Corinthians under which Ivan and Gustavo Mantuan move on loan to Zenit and Yuri Alberto would be loaned in the opposite direction. On 10 January 2023, the loan was terminated early as a part of the permanent transfer of Yuri Alberto.

International career
In May 2019, Ivan was called up by manager André Jardine for Brazil under-23 squad for the 2019 Toulon Tournament. He was a starter in the competition, playing in four of the five matches as his side was crowned champions. He was also a starter at the 2020 CONMEBOL Olympic Qualifying Championship, in which Brazil finished at 2nd place and clinched a spot for the 2020 Tokyo Olympics.

On 16 August 2019, Ivan was called up to the full side by manager Tite, for friendlies against Colombia and Peru.

Career statistics

Honours
Ponte Preta

Campeonato Paulista do Interior: 2018

International

Brazil U23
Toulon Tournament: 2019

References

External links
AA Ponte Preta profile 

1997 births
Living people
Footballers from São Paulo (state)
Brazilian footballers
Association football goalkeepers
Campeonato Brasileiro Série A players
Campeonato Brasileiro Série B players
Associação Atlética Ponte Preta players
Sport Club Corinthians Paulista players
FC Zenit Saint Petersburg players
CR Vasco da Gama players
Brazil youth international footballers
Brazilian expatriate footballers
Expatriate footballers in Russia
Brazilian expatriate sportspeople in Russia